José Joaquín Casasús (1733–1822) was a Spanish writer.

Born in Alzira, Valencia, José Joaquín Casasús was the son of José Javier Casasús Judici de Echarte, knight of the Order of Montesa, and of Margarita de Navía-Osorio y Roig, daughter of the marquess of Santa Cruz de Marcenado.
He attended Colegio de San Pablo de Valencia, where he studied Latin, French, and philosophy.

Writers from the Valencian Community
1733 births
1822 deaths